Takla Lake Marine Provincial Park is a provincial park in British Columbia, Canada. Located northeast of the town of Smithers and roughly parallel to Babine Lake to its west/southwest, it comprises three sites on Takla Lake in the northwestern part of the Omineca Country of the province's North-Central Interior.

References

External links
BC Parks infopage

Provincial parks of British Columbia
Omineca Country
Marine parks of Canada